Dykema is a leading national law firm serving business entities worldwide, from start-ups to Fortune 100 companies, on a wide range of complex legal issues. The firm has an especially strong presence in the Midwestern United States, where it first put down its roots in 1926,  and is the 118th largest law firm in the nation (2020). It has offices in various locations around the United States including California, Illinois, Michigan, Minnesota, Texas, Washington, D.C., and Wisconsin. Dykema's largest office is in Chicago but its combined southeastern Michigan offices are collectively larger. The 2015 merger with Cox Smith out of San Antonio has provided the firm with a significantly expanded presence in Texas and the American Southwest.

Among other areas, Dykema is recognized for having one of the strongest automotive practices in the United States and is one of the most sought-after firms for automotive companies. The firm represents Chrysler, Ford, General Motors, Honda, Kia, Mitsubishi, Nissan, Toyota, and Volvo.

Also substantial is Dykema’s banking and consumer financial services practice. A significant portion of the firm's reported litigation cases over the last two years have involved banking issues. According to the firm, it  "provides counseling and litigation representation to financial institutions, including banks, savings and loan associations, finance companies, credit card issuers, mortgage bankers, vendors and retailers." Dykema's Financial Industry Group publishes the NextGen Financial Services Report, a blog providing analysis on the commercial financial services industry. Dykema is also Michigan editor to the consumer financial services online publications HouseLaw and CarLaw.

Before most law firms even considered entering the cannabis industry, Dykema has been leading the way since 2007 to develop policy and laws surrounding the legality of cannabis. In 2007 and 2008, the firm helped draft and secure the overwhelming passage of the successful ballot initiative that created the Michigan Medical Marihuana Act.

History
 1926 Founded in Detroit, Michigan by Raymond K. Dykema, Elroy O. Jones and Renville Wheat.  
 1970 Opened its second office in Bloomfield Hills to manage its expanding client list. 
 1978 Opened its Washington, DC office.
 1995 Opened its Chicago office. 
 2003 Started its Los Angeles office by acquiring law firm Feeney Kellett Wienner & Bush. 
 2004 Dykema merges with Rooks Pitts, a Chicago firm founded in 1897, to significantly enhance its Midwest presence.  
 2007 Launched its first Texas office in Dallas. 
 2008 Merged with Schwartz Cooper, boosting its Chicago presence.  
 2013 Opened a new office in Minneapolis, its first in Minnesota.  
 2013 Opened an office in Austin, its second in Texas. 
 2015 Expanded its presence in Texas and the Southwest by combining with venerable Texas firm Cox Smith, adding offices in San Antonio and McAllen.
 2019 Dykema combines with Loss, Judge & Ward, doubling its Washington, DC presence. 
 2022 Opened its first Wisconsin office in Milwaukee. 
 2022 Opened an office in Houston, Texas.

Honors
Dykema is ranked as a top firm by Chambers USA: America's Leading Lawyers for Business, with Chambers identifying fourteen Dykema practice areas and twenty five Dykema lawyers in 2022 as leading practitioners in their fields   

The Legal 500 U.S. 2022 guide ranks Dykema in the top 10 for its Automotive Product Liability Litigation, Automotive Litigation, Gaming and Native American Law, and Cannabis Law practices. Additionally, the firm's Appellate and Critical Motions practice was included in the "Firms to Watch" list. 

180 of its attorneys, in multiple practice areas and markets, have been recognized in The Best Lawyers in America© 2023 guide and the Best Lawyers "Ones to Watch" list. Additionally, 10 of the firm’s practitioners have been named Best Lawyers 2023 “Lawyer of the Year,” a special distinction conferred upon a single lawyer within a practice area and metropolitan market.   

The firm earned a perfect score in the Human Rights Campaign’s 2022 Corporate Equality Index for its ninth consecutive year.

Also, over half (214) of Dykema attorneys were named a 2014 Super Lawyer or Rising Star by Thomson Reuters' "Super Lawyers", the annual ranking that recognizes attorneys who have attained a high-degree of peer recognition and professional achievement. Dykema was, in 2012, named the top corporate law firm in Detroit by Corporate Board Member Magazine for the second year. The 2012 study is the publication’s 12th annual Legal Industry Research Study, a comprehensive ranking by U.S. corporate directors and general counsel at the nation’s top corporate law firms.

Offices

 Ann Arbor
 Austin
 Bloomfield Hills
 Chicago
 Dallas
 Detroit
 Grand Rapids
 Houston
 Lansing
 Los Angeles
 McAllen
 Minneapolis
 San Antonio
 Washington, D.C.

References

External links
Dykema website
NextGen Financial Services Report published by Dykema Gossett
Martindale Hubbell profile of Dykema Gossett PLLC
Organizational Profile of Dykema Gossett at the National Law Review

Law firms established in 1897
Law firms based in Detroit
1897 establishments in Illinois